Prince Mohammed bin Abdullah Al Faisal Stadium, previously known as the Prince Sultan bin Fahd Stadium, is a multi-purpose stadium in Jeddah, Saudi Arabia. The stadium has a capacity of 10,000 people and opened in 1987. In October 2011 it was renamed as Prince Mohammed bin Abdullah Al Faisal Stadium as a tribute to Prince Mohammed bin Abdullah, one of the former presidents of Al Ahli club. It is used mostly for football matches and is the home stadium of Al Ahli club.

References

External links
Stadium picture

1987 establishments in Saudi Arabia
Buildings and structures in Jeddah
Football venues in Saudi Arabia
Multi-purpose stadiums in Saudi Arabia